The 2021 Stanley Cup playoffs was the playoff tournament of the National Hockey League (NHL). The playoffs began on May 15, 2021, and concluded on July 7, 2021, with the Tampa Bay Lightning winning their second consecutive and third overall Stanley Cup in franchise history, defeating the Montreal Canadiens four games to one in the Stanley Cup Finals. The playoffs were originally scheduled to begin a few days after the 2020–21 regular season, but they began four days prior to the end of the regular season after the Vancouver Canucks had eleven games postponed because of a COVID-19 outbreak.

The league returned to the traditional 16-team playoff format with all series being best-of-seven, after using a 24-team format in 2020 due to the regular season being cut short by the COVID-19 pandemic. Due to cross-border travel restrictions imposed by the Government of Canada, the league temporarily realigned this season into four divisions with no conferences. Consequently, the first two rounds of the playoffs featured intra-divisional matchups, with the higher seeded teams receiving home-ice advantage in those rounds. In the Stanley Cup Semifinals, the four remaining teams (one from each division) were reseeded based on their regular season records.  Both semifinal winners advanced to the Stanley Cup Finals. After initially stating that the Campbell and Wales trophies would not be awarded this season, the league decided in June 2021 that the Montreal Canadiens and Vegas Golden Knights would play for the Campbell Bowl and the New York Islanders and Tampa Bay Lightning would play for the Wales Trophy.

Although it was initially unknown whether the Canadian teams that qualified for the playoffs would be able to play in their home arenas after the Second Round, on June 6, it was announced that those teams would be allowed to play in their home arenas for the remainder of the playoffs. In order to complete the playoffs in Canada, the League applied for a cross-border travel exemption with the Public Health Agency of Canada. Prior to the announcement, there were some ideas of the Canadian team playing in a neutral NHL city in the US after the Second Round.

The Colorado Avalanche made the playoffs as the Presidents' Trophy winners with the most points (i.e. best record) during the regular season. The Pittsburgh Penguins increased their postseason appearance streak to 15 seasons, the longest active streak in the four major North American professional sports. For the second year in a row and third time overall since 1996, all California-based teams, the Anaheim Ducks, Los Angeles Kings, and San Jose Sharks, missed the playoffs. For the first time since 1966, every team that qualified for the playoffs was also in the previous year's postseason. With all of the Canadian-based NHL teams in one division, the format for this season ensured that there would be a Second Round series between two Canadian-based teams for the first time since 2002.

For the first time since 1992, three of the previous year's semifinalists, the New York Islanders, Tampa Bay Lightning and Vegas Golden Knights, returned to the round for a second consecutive season.

Playoff seeds

The top four teams in each of the four realigned divisions made the playoffs; this was the first time since 1993 that this format had been used.

The following teams qualified for the playoffs:

Central Division
 Carolina Hurricanes, Central Division champions – 80 points
 Florida Panthers – 79 points
 Tampa Bay Lightning – 75 points
 Nashville Predators – 64 points

East Division
 Pittsburgh Penguins, East Division champions – 77 points (29 , 34 )
 Washington Capitals – 77 points (29 , 33 )
 Boston Bruins – 73 points
 New York Islanders – 71 points

North Division
 Toronto Maple Leafs, North Division champions – 77 points
 Edmonton Oilers – 72 points
 Winnipeg Jets – 63 points
 Montreal Canadiens – 59 points

West Division
 Colorado Avalanche, West Division champions, Presidents' Trophy winners – 82 points (35 )
 Vegas Golden Knights – 82 points (30 )
 Minnesota Wild – 75 points
 St. Louis Blues – 63 points

Playoff bracket
In each round, teams competed in a best-of-seven series following a 2–2–1–1–1 format (scores in the bracket indicate the number of games won in each best-of-seven series). The team with home ice advantage played at home for games one and two (and games five and seven, if necessary), and the other team was at home for games three and four (and game six, if necessary). The top four teams in each division made the playoffs. 

In the First Round, the fourth seeded team in each division played against the division winner from their division. The other series matched the second and third place teams from the divisions. In each round, home ice advantage was awarded to the team that had the better regular season record. Teams advancing to the Stanley Cup Semifinals were re-seeded one through four based on regular season record.

Legend
 C1, C2, C3, C4 – The teams from the Central Division
 E1, E2, E3, E4 – The teams from the East Division
 N1, N2, N3, N4 – The teams from the North Division
 W1, W2, W3, W4 – The teams from the West Division

First Round

Central Division First Round

(C1) Carolina Hurricanes vs. (C4) Nashville Predators
The Carolina Hurricanes finished first in the Central Division earning 80 points. Nashville finished as the fourth seed in the Central Division, earning 64 points. This was the first playoff meeting between these two teams. Carolina won six of eight games in this year's regular season series.

The Hurricanes defeated the Predators in six games. Hurricanes captain Jordan Staal scored twice in Game 1 to give Carolina a 5–2 victory. In Game 2, Alex Nedeljkovic made 32 saves for the Hurricanes in a 3–0 shutout victory. Back in Nashville for Game 3, Juuse Saros stopped 52 shots and Matt Duchene scored at 14:54 of double-overtime for the Predators to emerge victorious 5–4. In Game 4, Juuse Saros made 58 saves for the Predators, defeating the Hurricanes 3–2 in double-overtime on Luke Kunin's snap shot goal. The Hurricanes forced overtime in Game 5, and in the extra period, Jordan Staal scored during a 4-on-4 to defeat the Predators 3–2 and take a 3–2 series lead. In Game 6, the Hurricanes overcame a two-goal deficit to force overtime, where Sebastian Aho scored on a deflected shot to send Carolina to the Second Round.

(C2) Florida Panthers vs. (C3) Tampa Bay Lightning
The Florida Panthers finished second in the Central Division with 79 points. The Tampa Bay Lightning earned 75 points to finish third in the Central Division. This was the first playoff meeting between these two rivals. Florida won five of eight games in this year's regular season series. This was also the first postseason match-up between two Florida-based professional sports teams since the National Football League's 1999 AFC Divisional Playoffs where the Jacksonville Jaguars defeated the Miami Dolphins.

The Lightning defeated the Panthers in six games. Upon his return from hip surgery in Game 1, Tampa Bay forward Nikita Kucherov scored twice and Brayden Point, on a breakaway attempt, scored with 1:14 left in the game to give the Lightning a 5–4 victory. In Game 2, Lightning goaltender Andrei Vasilevskiy made 32 saves for Tampa Bay as they defeated Florida 3–1 to take a 2–0 series lead. In Game 3, the Panthers gave up five goals in the second period; however, after a goalie change, Florida forced overtime where Ryan Lomberg scored to end the game 6–5 for the Panthers. The goaltending woes of the Panthers continued in Game 4 when Sergei Bobrovsky allowed five goals on fourteen shots giving the Lightning a 3–1 series lead after a 6–2 rout. In Game 5, Florida opted to start rookie goaltender Spencer Knight whose 36 saves made dividends for the Panthers in a 4–1 victory and extending a sixth game. Vasilevskiy held the fort for the Lightning in Game 6, posting a 29–save shutout in a 4–0 victory, advancing his team to the Second Round.

East Division First Round

(E1) Pittsburgh Penguins vs. (E4) New York Islanders
The Pittsburgh Penguins finished first in the East Division earning 77 points, winning the tiebreaker against Washington with 34 . The New York Islanders earned 71 points to finish fourth in the East Division. This was the sixth playoff meeting between these two teams, with New York winning four of the five previous series. They last met in the 2019 Eastern Conference First Round, which New York won in a four-game sweep. Pittsburgh won six of eight games in this year's regular season series.

The Islanders defeated the Penguins in six games. In Game 1, with Semyon Varlamov out as goaltender for New York, Ilya Sorokin stepped in and made 39 saves for the Islanders, defeating Pittsburgh in overtime on Kyle Palmieri's goal. Tristan Jarry made 37 saves for the Penguins in Game 2 who emerged victorious by the score of 2–1. The Islanders attempted a rally in the third period of Game 3 after being down by two goals. The comeback was spoiled at 16:24 when Penguins forward Brandon Tanev scored to make it 5–4. The Islanders played defensively in Game 4 with Sorokin stopping 29 shots in a 4–1 victory, tying the series 2–2. In Game 5, heading into double-overtime, Josh Bailey scored 51 seconds into the period for the Islanders to give his team a 3–2 series lead in a 3–2 victory. Brock Nelson scored twice and provided an assist in New York's Game 6 victory, advancing to the Second Round with a 5–3 triumph.

(E2) Washington Capitals vs. (E3) Boston Bruins
The Washington Capitals finished second in the East Division with 77 points, losing the tiebreaker against Pittsburgh with 33 . The Boston Bruins earned 73 points to finish third in the East Division. This was the fourth playoff series between these two teams, with Washington winning two of the three previous series. They last met in the 2012 Eastern Conference Quarterfinals, which Washington won in seven games, the first time in Stanley Cup playoff history where all seven games were decided by one goal. Washington won their round-robin game in the previous year's Stanley Cup Qualifiers 2–1. These teams split their eight-game regular season series.

The Bruins defeated the Capitals in five games. In Game 1, with the teams tied at two a-piece after the third period, Capitals forward Nic Dowd scored at 4:41 of overtime to give Washington their first victory of the series. With Game 2 tied 3–3 and heading into overtime again, the Bruins' Brad Marchand scored 39 seconds into the first overtime period to tie the series 1–1. In Game 3, the two teams extended into overtime for the third consecutive game where Capitals's goalie Ilya Samsonov misplayed the puck behind the net and Bruins forward Craig Smith scored in double overtime to give Boston a 3–2 victory. David Pastrnak scored a goal and provided an assist in Boston's 4–1 victory of Game 4, taking a 3–1 series and a chance to advance in Game 5. In Game 5, captain Patrice Bergeron scored twice for the Bruins, ending the series with a 3–1 victory.

North Division First Round

(N1) Toronto Maple Leafs vs. (N4) Montreal Canadiens
The Toronto Maple Leafs finished first in the North Division earning 77 points. The Montreal Canadiens earned 59 points to finish fourth in the North Division. This was the sixteenth playoff meeting between these two rivals, with Montreal winning eight of the fifteen previous series. They last met in the 1979 Stanley Cup Quarterfinals, which Montreal won in a four-game sweep. Toronto won seven of ten games in this year's regular season series.

The Canadiens defeated the Maple Leafs in seven games after being down 3–1 in the series. In Game 1, Maple Leafs captain John Tavares got upended by Ben Chiarot; while falling to the ice, Canadiens forward Corey Perry attempted to jump over Tavares' head; however, Perry's knee clipped the Toronto captain in the head. Ultimately, Tavares required a stretcher to leave the ice and was transported to the hospital. After the game, Perry expressed sincere remorse for his actions stating "I don’t know what else to do there. I tried to jump. I know Johnny pretty well and just hope he’s OK." The Canadiens won the game 2–1 on Carey Price's 35 saves along with Paul Byron's shorthanded game-winning goal in the third period. In Game 2, Auston Matthews scored a goal and two assists in the Maple Leafs' 5–1 victory to tie the series 1–1. The victory was their first playoff win over Montreal since their 1967 Stanley Cup-clinching game. In Game 3, the Maple Leafs scored twice in the second period, and with Jack Campbell's 28-save performance, secured a 2–1 victory. Campbell continued his goaltending prowess into Game 4 with a 4–0 shutout victory, stopping all 32 shots he faced and granting the Maple Leafs a 3–1 series lead. In Game 5, the Canadiens grabbed a 3–0 lead in the second period, however, the Maple Leafs tied the game with 8:06 left in the third period to force overtime. In overtime, Toronto forward Alex Galchenyuk gave the puck away causing a 2-on-0 break for rookie Cole Caufield and Nick Suzuki, the latter of which scored to spoil the Maple Leafs comeback and forced a sixth game. The first two periods of Game 6 remained scoreless until the third period where Montreal scored two power-play goals. In the final nine minutes, Toronto evened the score to send it to overtime where Maple Leafs defenceman Travis Dermott gave the puck up to Paul Byron who passed it towards Jesperi Kotkaniemi for the game-winning goal at 15:15, tying the series 3–3 with a 3–2 victory. Canadiens goalie Carey Price made 30 saves in Game 7, defeating Toronto 3–1 and completing a 3–1 series comeback. With the victory, Montreal ties the NHL record for most series victories after being down 3–1 in a series.

(N2) Edmonton Oilers vs. (N3) Winnipeg Jets
The Edmonton Oilers finished second in the North Division with 72 points. The Winnipeg Jets earned 63 points to finish third in the North Division. This was the first playoff meeting between these two teams. This was also the first Stanley Cup playoff meeting between these two cities since the 1990 Smythe Division Semifinals. Edmonton won seven of nine games in this year's regular season series.

The Jets defeated the Oilers in their first four-game sweep in franchise history. In Game 1, Connor Hellebuyck made 32 saves for the Jets, defeating the Oilers 4–1. Hellebuyck continued to his goaltending dominance in Game 2 as the Oilers poured off 38 shots and no goals in a 1–0 overtime shutout loss. In Game 3, the Oilers jumped out to a 4–1 lead in the third period; the Jets were able to tie the game less than ten minutes later, with all three goals coming in a span of just over three minutes to force overtime. In overtime, Nikolaj Ehlers, who had been injured up to this game, scored to complete the comeback and snatch a 3–0 series lead. With Game 4 headed into triple-overtime, the Jets ended the marathon with Kyle Connor's series-clinching goal at 6:52, sweeping the Oilers in four games upon a 4–3 victory.

West Division First Round

(W1) Colorado Avalanche vs. (W4) St. Louis Blues
The Colorado Avalanche earned the Presidents' Trophy as the NHL's best regular season team with 82 points, winning the tiebreaker against the Vegas Golden Knights with 35 . St. Louis finished as the fourth seed in the West Division, earning 63 points. This was the second playoff series between these two teams. Their only previous meeting was in the 2001 Western Conference Final, which Colorado won in five games. Colorado won their round-robin game in the previous year's Stanley Cup Qualifiers 2–1. Colorado won five of eight games in this year's regular season series.

The Avalanche defeated the Blues in a four-game sweep. In Game 1, the Avalanche shot the puck 50 times throughout the game with Nathan MacKinnon potting two goals and an assist in a 4–1 victory. MacKinnon scored a hat-trick in Game 2 as the Avalanche defeated the Blues 6–3. During the game, Avalanche forward Nazem Kadri hit Blues defenceman Justin Faulk in the head. Kadri would be suspended for eight games for the hit, although he filed an appeal, the suspension was upheld on May 31. In Game 3, Avalanche defenceman Ryan Graves scored a goal and two assists and Philipp Grubauer made 31 saves to defeat the Blues 5–1 and take a commanding 3–0 series lead. In Game 4, the Avalanche offensively drained the Blues with 34 shots and, with two empty-net goals, Colorado defeated St. Louis 5–2 to advance to the Second Round.

(W2) Vegas Golden Knights vs. (W3) Minnesota Wild
The Vegas Golden Knights finished second in the West Division with 82 points, losing the tiebreaker against Colorado with 30 . The Minnesota Wild earned 75 points to finish third in the West Division. This was the first playoff meeting between these two teams. Minnesota won five of eight games in this year's regular season series.

The Golden Knights defeated the Wild in seven games after having a 3–1 series lead. Vegas goalie Marc-Andre Fleury made NHL history in Game 1, becoming the first goaltender to start at least one game during the playoffs in fifteen consecutive seasons. However, his team ended up losing the game in an overtime shutout via Wild goalie Cam Talbot's 42-save performance and Joel Eriksson Ek's goal. In Game 2, Alex Tuch scored twice for the Golden Knights, winning the match 3–1. In Game 3, the Golden Knights scored five straight after being down 2–0 in the first period en route to a 5–2 victory. Fleury shut out the Wild in Game 4, stopping all 35 shots he faced in a 4–0 victory taking a 3–1 series lead. On the brink in Game 5, the Wild were minimized to 14 shots, however, they scored 4 times and turned away 38 shots to win 4–2 and extend the series to a sixth game. The Wild staved off elimination in Game 6, scoring three goals in the third period of Cam Talbot's 23-save shutout to win 3–0. In Game 7, Mattias Janmark scored a hat-trick for the Golden Knights, preventing the Wild from completing a 3–1 series comeback with a 6–2 rout.

Second Round

Central Division Second Round

(C1) Carolina Hurricanes vs. (C3) Tampa Bay Lightning
This was the first playoff meeting between these two teams. These teams split their eight-game regular season series.

The Lightning defeated the Hurricanes in five games. Lightning goalie Andrei Vasilevskiy backstopped Tampa Bay with 37 saves in Game 1, defeating the Hurricanes 2–1. In Game 2, Vasilevskiy continued his goaltending excellence with 31 saves, defeating the Hurricanes again by the score of 2–1. The Hurricanes opted to start Petr Mrazek in Game 3, which paid dividends as the goaltender made 35 saves in Carolina's 3–2 overtime victory with Jordan Staal scoring the game-winning goal. In Game 4, the Hurricanes and Lightning combined for eight goals in the second period, with Tampa Bay overcoming a two-goal deficit in that period and defeating Carolina 6–4 for a 3–1 series lead. Vasilevskiy made 29 saves in a 2–0 shutout victory in Game 5, advancing Tampa Bay to the Stanley Cup Semifinals for the second consecutive season.

East Division Second Round

(E3) Boston Bruins vs. (E4) New York Islanders
This was the third playoff meeting between these two teams with New York winning both previous series. They last met in the 1983 Prince of Wales Conference Final, which New York won in six games. New York won five of eight games in this year's regular season series.

The Islanders defeated the Bruins in six games. In Game 1, David Pastrnak scored a hat trick to give the Bruins a 5–2 victory. Casey Cizikas evened the series for the Islanders in Game 2, scoring the overtime goal at 14:48 on a breakaway for New York and defeating Boston 4–3. In Game 3, the Bruins and Islanders played defensively until overtime was required. In overtime, Brad Marchand scored in the first overtime period to give Boston a 2–1 victory. Mathew Barzal scored the game-winning goal of Game 4, scoring with 6:57 left in the third period and adding an assist in a 4–1 victory, tying the series 2–2. In Game 5, the Islanders jumped to a 5–2 lead early in the third period, then held off the Bruins' potential comeback to win 5–4. Brock Nelson scored twice, including the series-winning goal, for the Islanders in Game 6 defeating the Bruins 6–2 and advancing to the Stanley Cup Semifinals.

North Division Second Round

(N3) Winnipeg Jets vs. (N4) Montreal Canadiens
This was the first playoff meeting between these two teams. This was also the first Stanley Cup playoff meeting between these two cities since 1908, when the Montreal Wanderers retained the Stanley Cup by defeating the Winnipeg Maple Leafs. Winnipeg won six of nine games in this year's regular season series. This was the first Second Round series between two Canadian-based NHL teams since 2002.

The Canadiens defeated the Jets in a four-game sweep. In Game 1, Joel Edmundson had two assists in the Canadiens' 5–3 victory. After Canadiens forward Jake Evans scored the empty-net goal against Winnipeg, Jets forward Mark Scheifele charged into the centre knocking him to the ice. Evans required a stretcher to leave the ice. Scheifele was suspended for four games following the hit. Tyler Toffoli scored the only goal of Game 2 as Carey Price shut out the Jets 1–0, making 30 saves in the process. In Game 3, Joel Armia scored twice and added an assist to Montreal's 5–1 victory, granting the Canadiens a 3–0 series lead. In Game 4, the Jets came back from a two-goal deficit in the second period, eventually forcing overtime. In the overtime period, Toffoli scored the series-winning goal at 1:39, completing the four-game sweep, and advancing Montreal to the Stanley Cup Semifinals.

West Division Second Round

(W1) Colorado Avalanche vs. (W2) Vegas Golden Knights
This was the first playoff series between these two teams. Vegas won their round-robin game in the previous year's Stanley Cup Qualifiers 4–3. These teams split their eight-game regular season series.

The Golden Knights defeated the Avalanche in six games. In Game 1, the Golden Knights opted to start Robin Lehner in place of Marc-Andre Fleury; Lehner proceeded to allow seven goals in the game with Nathan MacKinnon and captain Gabriel Landeskog both scoring twice and Cale Makar assisting thrice in a 7–1 rout of Vegas. With Game 2 headed to overtime, Vegas forward Reilly Smith took a slashing penalty on Mikko Rantanen. On the ensuing power-play for Colorado, Rantanen scored to give the Avalanche a 3–2 victory. Jonathan Marchessault and Max Pacioretty scored 45 second apart in the third period of Game 3 taking the lead in the game and winning 3–2 for the Golden Knights. Marchessault scored a hat trick in Game 4, evening the series 2–2 with a 5–1 victory. In Game 5, the Avalanche grabbed a 2–0 lead, except the Golden Knights expunged that lead in the third period, marking their goals 3:04 apart and forcing overtime. In overtime, captain Mark Stone scored 50 seconds into the extra period, granting Vegas a 3–2 series lead with a 3–2 victory. In Game 6, Alex Pietrangelo scored a goal and two assists in a 6–3 victory, advancing Vegas to the third round for the second consecutive season.

Stanley Cup Semifinals
Note: All teams advancing from the Second Round into the Semifinals were reseeded based on the final League Standings.
This was the first time since 1981 that this round was not contested as Conference Finals. Due to the league using an intra-divisional schedule during the regular season, none of the participants in the Stanley Cup Semifinals played each other during this year's regular season. The last time this occurred was in 1924 when the Stanley Cup was contested by the champions of the NHL, PCHA and WCHL.

(1) Vegas Golden Knights vs. (4) Montreal Canadiens
This was the first playoff meeting between these two teams. This was Vegas' second consecutive Semifinals/Conference Finals appearance and third within their four seasons of play. Vegas lost the previous year's Western Conference Final in five games to the Dallas Stars. Montreal made their eighth Semifinals/Conference Finals appearance since the league began using a 16-team or greater playoff format in 1980. Their most recent Semifinals/Conference Finals appearance was in the 2014 Eastern Conference Final, which they lost to the New York Rangers in six games.

The Canadiens defeated the Golden Knights in six games. The Golden Knights struck first in Game 1; with the goal, Montreal trailed in a game for the first time since Game 4 of their First Round series with the Maple Leafs. Shea Theodore lead Vegas in that game scoring a goal and an assist in a 4–1 victory. In Game 2, the Canadiens scored twice in the first period and held off a third period rush by the Golden Knights to win 3–2. Back in Montreal for Game 3, Vegas goaltender Marc-Andre Fleury misplayed the puck behind his net, coughing up the puck to Josh Anderson who tied the game with 1:55 left in the game. In overtime, Jesperi Kotkaniemi threw the puck to an open Anderson and Paul Byron, the former of which scored to give Montreal a 3–2 victory. After missing Game 3, Canadiens' interim head coach Dominique Ducharme tested positive for COVID-19, placing him in isolation for fourteen days; he continued working with the team through phone and video calls, talking with the coaching staff and players through the remainder of the series. Robin Lehner started for Vegas in Game 4, making 27 saves in a 2–1 overtime win with Nicolas Roy scoring the game-winning goal 1:18 into the first overtime. In Game 5, Nick Suzuki provided a goal and two assists in Montreal's 4–1 victory, giving the Canadiens a chance to clinch a spot in the Finals in Game 6. Carey Price made 37 saves and Artturi Lehkonen scored the overtime series-winning goal in Game 6, sending the Canadiens to the Stanley Cup Finals for the first time since 1993. As the winners of the Semifinal and due to the temporary playoff restructuring, the Canadiens accepted their first Clarence S. Campbell Bowl, normally presented to the Western Conference playoff champions.

(2) Tampa Bay Lightning vs. (3) New York Islanders
This was the second consecutive postseason match-up and the fourth overall playoff meeting between these two teams; with Tampa Bay winning all three previous series. Both teams were in their second consecutive Semifinals/Conference Finals appearance; Tampa Bay was in their seventh appearance while New York was in their eighth appearance in the Semifinals/Conference Finals since the league began using a 16-team or greater playoff format in 1980. Tampa Bay won the previous year's Eastern Conference Final match-up in six games. This was also the first Semifinal/Conference Final since 2014 to feature a rematch of the previous year's Semifinal/Conference Final series.

The Lightning defeated the Islanders in seven games. In Game 1, Islanders goalie Semyon Varlamov made 30 saves for New York, defeating Tampa Bay 2–1. The Lightning evened the series in Game 2, led by Nikita Kucherov's three assists in a 4–2 victory. Andrei Vasilevskiy was stout for the Lightning in Game 3, making 27 saves in a 2–1 victory. New York spoiled the Lightning's comeback in Game 4 with Ryan Pulock blocking a shot with 2.7 seconds left in the game to preserve a 3–2 lead, tying the series 2–2. The Lightning dominated in Game 5, scoring eight unanswered goals, granting Vasilevskiy a 21-save 8–0 shutout victory. In Game 6, which later proved to be the last game ever played at the Nassau Veterans Memorial Coliseum, the Islanders overcame a 2–0 deficit and won in overtime thanks to Anthony Beauvillier's goal, preserving the series to a seventh game. Yanni Gourde scored the only goal of Game 7, short-handed early in the second period, whilst Vasilevskiy made 18 saves in a 1–0 shutout victory for Tampa Bay, advancing to the Stanley Cup Finals for the second consecutive season. As the winners of the Semifinal and due to the temporary playoff restructuring, the Lightning accepted the Prince of Wales Trophy normally presented to the Eastern Conference playoff champions.

Stanley Cup Finals

This was the fourth playoff meeting between these two teams with Tampa Bay winning two of the three previous series. They last met in the 2015 Eastern Conference Second Round, which Tampa Bay won in six games. This was Tampa Bay's second consecutive Finals appearance and fourth overall. They won last year's Finals against the Dallas Stars in six games. Montreal appeared in their thirty-fifth Stanley Cup Finals. They are the most recent Canadian-based team to win the Stanley Cup, doing so in 1993 (their most recent Finals appearance) against the Los Angeles Kings, winning in five games. They were also the first Canadian team since the Vancouver Canucks in 2011 to reach the Finals. This was the first Finals since 2009 to feature two teams in the same time zone. These teams did not play each other during this year's regular season.

Player statistics

Skaters
These are the top ten skaters based on points, following the conclusion of the playoffs.

Goaltenders
This is a combined table of the top five goaltenders based on goals against average and the top five goaltenders based on save percentage, with at least 420 minutes played. The table is sorted by GAA, and the criteria for inclusion are bolded.

Television
In Canada, for the seventh postseason under Rogers Media's current 12-year contract, coverage was broadcast by Sportsnet and CBC under the Hockey Night in Canada brand, and streamed on Sportsnet Now, CBCSports.ca (for games televised by CBC), or the subscription service Rogers NHL Live.

For this season, lead play-by-play voice Jim Hughson did not call any of Sportsnet's playoff games, having opted to work only nationally televised Vancouver Canucks home games during the regular season. Consequently, Chris Cuthbert joined lead colour commentator Craig Simpson on Sportsnet's lead broadcast team, calling the Canadiens–Maple Leafs series on-site for the First Round, the Jets–Canadiens series in the Second Round, the Golden Knights–Canadiens series in the semifinals, and the entire 2021 Stanley Cup Finals. Harnarayan Singh and Louie DeBrusk served as the secondary team, doing a similar role for the Oilers–Jets series. John Bartlett and Garry Galley served as the tertiary team, calling a select number of games from the West, Central, and East Division series inside the Sportsnet studios on CBC, while those broadcast on Sportsnet were simulcasts of NBC Sports' feeds.

This marked the final postseason under NBC Sports' 10-year contract for American television rights to the NHL. All national coverage of games were aired on either NBCSN, the NBC broadcast network, NHL Network, USA Network, or CNBC. During the First Round, excluding games exclusively broadcast on NBC, the regional rights holders of each participating U.S. team produced local telecasts of their respective games.

After NBC's lead play-by-play voice Mike "Doc" Emrick retired at the end of the previous season, NBC split top play-by-play duties between Kenny Albert and John Forslund during the regular season. For the playoffs, Albert, Eddie Olczyk, and Brian Boucher served as the lead broadcast team while Forslund, Joe Micheletti, and Pierre McGuire served as the secondary team. Brendan Burke and A. J. Mleczko primarily served as the tertiary team. Rounding out NBC's broadcast crew were play-by-play voices Alex Faust and John Walton, and analysts Keith Jones, Dominic Moore, and Jody Shelley. Most first-round games were called remotely, with a few others called on-site. For the Second Round, all games were called on-site except the Jets–Canadiens series. All games were called on-site starting with the semifinals. Peacock, NBC's streaming service, streamed all remaining games of the Stanley Cup playoffs starting on June 14.

As it had been done throughout the regular season due to COVID-19 protocols, the home broadcaster provided a neutral "world feed" to the other media partners for at the first two rounds: the home team's regional rightsholder during most first-round games in the U.S., NBC for the rest of the U.S. games, and Sportsnet for all games played in Canada.

Amazon Web Services debuted advanced shot and save analytics for the playoffs, taking data from the player and puck tracking technology that was first implemented at the start of the regular season. NBC is using a redesigned score bug to display these new statistics.

References

External links
 Stanley Cup playoffs

Stanley Cup playoffs
play